Cesare Fracanzano (1605-1651), a Neapolitan painter who flourished in the 17th century, was a pupil of Spagnoletto. 
Born in Bisceglie, in Apulia by Alessandro, a nobleman originally from Verona and a mannerist painter.
His pictorial style was based on Ribera, but also on Tintoretto, the Carracci brothers and Guido Reni. After long years of artistic preparation and work in Naples, in 1626 he returned to Apulia, to Barletta where he married Beatrice Covelli. He worked a lot in the Apulian town in  churches and noble palaces. He moved from his hometown only to carry out work commitments in Naples, Rome and other places in Apulia. 
There is in the Museo del Prado (Madrid) a picture by him, representing Two Wrestlers. His son, Michelangelo Fracanzano, who was also a painter, died in France about 1685. His brother Francesco was also a painter.

Gallery

References

External links

Jusepe de Ribera, 1591-1652, a full text exhibition catalog from The Metropolitan Museum of Art, which includes material on Cesare Fracanzano (see index)

1605 births
1651 deaths
17th-century Italian painters
Italian male painters
Painters from Naples
People from the Province of Barletta-Andria-Trani